Alejandro Ricardo Dolina (born May 20, 1944) is an Argentine broadcaster, who also achieved fame as a musician, writer, radio host and television actor.  He studied Law, Music, Literature and History. He is most famous for his classic radio show La venganza será terrible, which is the most tuned radio program of late nights in Argentina.

Works

Novels
 Crónicas del Ángel Gris (Ediciones de la Urraca, 1988), illustrations of Nine.
 Crónicas del Ángel Gris. Edición corregida y aumentada (Colihue, 1996), illustrations of Hermenegildo Sábat.
 El libro del fantasma (Colihue, 1999), illustrations of Nine.
 Bar del Infierno (Planeta, 2005)
 Cartas marcadas (Editorial Planeta, 2012)
 Notas al pie (Editorial Planeta, 2021)

Musicals
 Lo que me costó el amor de Laura. Opereta Criolla - Operetta (Colihue, 1998).
 Radiocine (Planeta, 2002).

Music
 Tangos del Bar del infierno (2004)

Theater
 El barrio del Ángel Gris (1990)
 Teatro de Medianoche (1991)
 Bar del Infierno (2004)

Radio
 Mañanitas nocturnas (1972)
 Demasiado tarde para lágrimas (1985–1991)
 El ombligo del mundo (1992)
 La venganza será terrible (1993–Present)

TV
 Rêves, bifteck et démocratie, Allons tous à Viedma, Tout est mort, je le sais, documentaries, dir. Françoise Prébois,  France 3 (1986)
 La barra de Dolina (1990)
 Fuga de cerebros (1991)
 El ombligo del mundo (1992)
 Bar del Infierno (2003)
 Recordando el show de Alejandro Molina (2011)

Film (as actor)
 Las puertitas del señor López (1988) (as God)
 El día que Maradona conoció a Gardel (1996)
 Noah's Ark (2007) (voice only)

References 

1944 births
Argentine male actors
Argentine musicians
Argentine male writers
Argentine radio presenters
Living people
Illustrious Citizens of Buenos Aires